This is a discography of Giuseppe Verdi's penultimate opera, Otello. It was first performed at La Scala, Milan, on 5 February 1887.

Otello has been recorded complete on disc and film a number of times since World War II, but most music-guide reviewers contend that a recording made of a 1947 NBC radio broadcast of the opera conducted by Arturo Toscanini and featuring singers  Herva Nelli, Ramón Vinay and Giuseppe Valdengo, is musically the best of these versions. RCA Victor has issued the Toscanini recording several times on commercial LPs and on CD in digitally remastered form. In addition, performances of Otello were captured live as early as the 1920s (at the Royal Opera House, Covent Garden, London) and the 1930s (at the Metropolitan Opera, New York City, the latter via the Metropolitan Opera radio broadcasts). They, too, are available on CD reissues. A wide variety of stage performances dating from the 1950s to the present day are also to be had on CD or on DVD.

Audio and video recordings

Extracts
Individual arias, duets and scenes from Otello have been committed to disc by many celebrated tenors, baritones and sopranos since acceptable audio technology was first developed in the early 20th century. The best of these recorded extracts have been reissued on CD and make for fascinating comparative listening. Recordings made in the early 1900s by the creators of the roles of Otello and Iago, namely Francesco Tamagno and Victor Maurel, are among those now available in digital formats.

References

External links
Detailed Otello discography – operadis-opera-discography.org.uk

Opera discographies
Operas by Giuseppe Verdi